HMS Orion was a 91-gun Hood-class second rate of the Royal Navy. She was launched in 1854 and was the second of six ships to carry the name.

Service
Orion was ordered as an 80-gun second rate on 30 March 1848 and laid down at Chatham Dockyard on 1 February 1850. With the advent of steam propulsion in warship design, Orion was reordered on 30 October 1852 to a new design, to incorporate a steam engine and a propeller. She was launched on 6 November 1854 and completed by 29 March 1855, with sea trials beginning on 24 February 1856 from Devonport.

Orion was commanded from her commissioning until late 1857 by Captain John Elphinstone Erskine. She took part in the Crimean War in 1855, serving in the Baltic Sea. On 23 April 1856 she was present at the Fleet Review at Spithead. For her service in the Baltic she was awarded the battle honour Baltic 1855.

She sailed across the Atlantic Ocean, arriving at Havana on 14 July 1857 from Port Royal, and then departed for Halifax on 16 July 1857. She then sailed to the Mediterranean Sea in 1860.

References

Ships of the line of the Royal Navy
1854 ships
Ships built in Chatham
Victorian-era ships of the line of the United Kingdom
Crimean War naval ships of the United Kingdom